Acrasia (foaled 1897) was an Australian racehorse that won the 1904 Melbourne Cup.

Racing career 

Bred and owned by bookmaker Humphrey Oxenham, Acrasia finished fourth in the 1902 Melbourne Cup.

She was ridden by jockey Tom Clayton and carried 7 st. 6 lbs. (47.17 kg) to win the 1904 Melbourne Cup as a seven-year-old at odds of 14/1. She was the only filly or mare in the field. In doing so she became the third mare to win in the first 44 runnings of the race.

In Spring carnival leading up to the Cup, she had finished second in the Spring Cup at Sandown Park and also in the Coongy Handicap and Caulfield Cup.

Her owner, Humphrey Oxenham, was a bookmaker who, while playing poker, staked her and lost ownership to John Mayo. He bought her back the following day and owned her at the time of her win.

References 

Melbourne Cup winners
1897 racehorse births
Racehorses trained in Australia